Buluba Hospital, whose formal name is St. Francis Hospital Buluba, is a community hospital in Uganda. It is owned and operated by the Roman Catholic Diocese of Jinja.

Location
The hospital is located in the village of Buluba, in Baitambogwe sub county, Bunya west constituency in  Mayuge District, Busoga sub-region, Eastern Region of Uganda. The coordinates of Buluba Hospital are 0°29'32.0"N, 33°23'06.0"E (Latitude:0.492222; Longitude:33.385000).

Overview
St. Francis Hospital Buluba, is a rural community hospital, that serves the population of Mayuge District. It is the only General Hospital in the district. Due to the good quality of services rendered, many patients travel from other parts of the country to seek services at this facility.

History
The hospital was founded in 1934 by the Franciscan Missionary Sisters for Africa.  Eventually, the Franciscan Sisters handed over the hospital to the Roman Catholic Diocese of Jinja. The diocese entrusted the management and administration of the hospital to a native religious congregation of Franciscan Sisters, the Little Sisters of St. Francis. In the beginning, the hospital specialized in the treatment of leprosy, which was endemic in the area. Wanda Błeńska, a Polish expert in tropical diseases, worked there from 1951 to 1994 and developed the hospital into an internationally recognized centre for leprosy treatment. Later, the hospital added tuberculosis to the diseases it specializes in. Buluba Hospital maintains a prosthetic unit (initiated by Błeńska), one of the few in the country. As of January 2014, while the hospital attended to all general medical problems, they were adept and experienced in handling patients with leprosy and tuberculosis. Often, these patients also suffered from HIV/AIDS.

See also
List of hospitals in Uganda

References

External links
 Leprosy Hospital Stuck With Former Patients

Hospitals established in 1934
Hospitals in Uganda
Mayuge District
Busoga
Franciscan hospitals
Leper hospitals
Catholic hospitals in Africa
1934 establishments in Uganda